The Arcadia Historic District is a U.S. historic district in Arcadia, Florida. On May 10, 1984, it was added to the U.S. National Register of Historic Places.

See also
National Register of Historic Places listings in DeSoto County, Florida

References

External links

Geography of DeSoto County, Florida
Historic districts on the National Register of Historic Places in Florida
National Register of Historic Places in DeSoto County, Florida